Crater Mountain is an  mountain summit located in the North Cascades of Washington state. It is the 29th highest mountain in the Pasayten Wilderness. The Jerry Glacier resides in the cirque on the upper north slopes of the mountain. The crater-like summit of the mountain is not of volcanic origin. Crater Mountain is grouped in the sub-range Hozameen Range, which also includes Hozomeen Mountain and Jack Mountain.

Geology 
The mountain is composed mostly of Metavolcanic rock and Metasedimentary rock from the Hozameen Group. Most predominate is greenstone from the Jurassic to Permian periods. Crater Mountain is carved from greenstone of the Hozomeen Terrane, once the basaltic floor of the ancient Methow Ocean. The mountain's name probably derives from the craterlike shape of its summit, which was carved from the ancient metamorphosed basalt by modern cirque glaciers. The rugged battlements of the greenstone viewed from the highway rest above phyllite of the Little Jack terrane, which is exposed in the lower slopes of the mountain.

Climate
Crater Mountain is located in the marine west coast climate zone of western North America. Most weather fronts originate in the Pacific Ocean, and travel northeast toward the Cascade Mountains. As fronts approach the North Cascades, they are forced upward by the peaks of the Cascade Range, causing them to drop their moisture in the form of rain or snowfall onto the Cascades. As a result, the west side of the North Cascades experiences high precipitation, especially during the winter months in the form of snowfall. Due to its temperate climate and proximity to the Pacific Ocean, areas west of the Cascade Crest very rarely experience temperatures below  or above . During winter months, weather is usually cloudy, but, due to high pressure systems over the Pacific Ocean that intensify during summer months, there is often little or no cloud cover during the summer. Because of maritime influence, snow tends to be wet and heavy, resulting in high avalanche danger. The months July through September offer the most favorable weather for viewing or climbing this peak.

Gallery

See also

 Geography of Washington (state)
 Geology of the Pacific Northwest

References

External links
 Weather forecast: Crater Mountain

Mountains of Washington (state)
Mountains of Whatcom County, Washington
Cascade Range
North Cascades
North American 2000 m summits
North Cascades of Washington (state)